Ezgi may refer to:

People
 Suphi Ezgi (1869 – 1962), Ottoman military physician, musician, musicologist and composer.
 Ezgi Asaroğlu (born 1987), Turkish film and television actress
 Ezgi Gunuc (born 1988), Turkish musician and composer
 Ezgi Çağlar (born 1991), Turkish goalkeeper
 Ezgi Dilik (born 1995), Turkish volleyball player
 Ezgi Mola (born 1983), Turkish actress
 Ezgi Gör  (born 2003), Turkish actress

Music
 Ezginin Günlüğü, Turkish music group which was formed in 1981